Viggo Jørgensen (8 August 1899 – 21 May 1986) was a Danish footballer. He competed in the men's tournament at the 1920 Summer Olympics.

References

External links
 

1899 births
1986 deaths
Danish men's footballers
Denmark international footballers
Olympic footballers of Denmark
Footballers at the 1920 Summer Olympics
Footballers from Copenhagen
Association football forwards
Boldklubben 1903 players